Ethyl carfluzepate is a drug which is a benzodiazepine derivative. It is similar to ethyl loflazepate in chemical structure, the other difference being an absence of methylcarbamoyl group. Its properties are mainly sedative and hypnotic.

References

Benzodiazepines
Chloroarenes
Fluoroarenes
Lactams
Ureas
Ethyl esters
GABAA receptor positive allosteric modulators